Listed below are the dates and results for the 1970 FIFA World Cup qualification rounds for the South American Zone (CONMEBOL). For an overview of the qualification rounds, see the article 1970 FIFA World Cup qualification.

The 10 teams were divided into 2 groups of 3 teams each and 1 group of 4 teams. 3 spots were open for competition. The teams would play against each other on a home-and-away basis.

Groups

Group 1

Peru qualified.

The Bolivia v Peru match on 10 August 1969 is infamous for being fixed by Argentina in favour of Bolivia. Match referee Sergio Chechelev annulled a valid goal from Peru without any justification, allowing Bolivia to win 2–1. Years later, Chechelev excused himself saying that Argentina had paid him to favour Bolivia.

This has been the only time that Argentina failed to qualify to a World Cup tournament.

Group 2

Brazil qualified.

Group 3

Uruguay qualified.

Qualified teams
The following three teams from CONMEBOL qualified for the final tournament.

1 Bold indicates champions for that year. Italic indicates hosts for that year.

Goalscorers

References

External links
FIFA World Cup Official Site – 1970 World Cup Qualification 
 RSSF.com

CONMEBOL
FIFA World Cup qualification (CONMEBOL)